Eugene Horace Freed (March 18, 1930 – July 17, 2009) was an American bridge player and physician. Freed was a plastic surgeon from Los Angeles, California. He graduated from California State University, San Diego and University of Southern California.

Freed was born in Somerville, New Jersey, and was raised there until his family moved to San Diego when he was about 15. They lived near San Diego State University and he went to college there.

He died from a heart disease at home in Los Angeles.

Medical practice

Freed was a private ear, nose, and throat specialist with "the same office on Wilshire Boulevard" for more than 50 years.

In his medical practice, he treated Maria Callas, Alfred Drake, Larry Fine (one of The Three Stooges), Mario Lanza, Chita Rivera.

Eventually he specialized in evaluations for Workmen's Compensation.

Bridge accomplishments

Wins

 North American Bridge Championships (6)
 Lebhar IMP Pairs (2) 1988, 1998 
 Leventritt Silver Ribbon Pairs (1) 1995 
 Truscott Senior Swiss Teams (2) 2002, 2005 
 Mitchell Board-a-Match Teams (1) 1986

Runners-up

 North American Bridge Championships
 Senior Knockout Teams (2) 1998, 2006

References

External links

 

1930 births
2009 deaths
American contract bridge players
American plastic surgeons
People from Los Angeles
People from Somerville, New Jersey
San Diego State University alumni
Keck School of Medicine of USC alumni
20th-century surgeons